Binnamangala may refer to several places in or near Bangalore, Karnataka, India:

 Binnamangala, Bangalore, a neighborhood in Bangalore
 Binnamangala Manavarthe Kaval or BM Kaval, former village and present neighborhood in Bangalore
 Binnamangala, Doddaballapur, a village in Devanahalli Taluk, Bangalore Rural district
 Binnamangala, Nelamangala, a former village, now included in Nelamangala Town,  Bangalore Rural district
 Binnamangala, Sidlaghatta, a village in Sidlaghatta Taluk, Chikkaballapur district

See also
 Arebinnamangala, a village in Bangalore North Taluk, Bangalore Urban district